The Matrix Reloaded: The Album is a 2003 soundtrack album from the 2003 film The Matrix Reloaded. The two-disc album is unusual among soundtrack releases in that it includes separate discs for the film's songs and the score, whereas most films release the songs and the score as separate single-disc albums.

The album's lead single was "Sleeping Awake" by P.O.D. The song's lyrics and video refer to elements of the film.

Track listing

Disc 1
 "Session" by Linkin Park – 2:23
 "This Is the New Shit" by Marilyn Manson – 4:19
 "Reload" by Rob Zombie – 4:25
 "Furious Angels" by Rob Dougan – 5:29
 "Lucky You" by Deftones – 4:08
 "The Passportal" by Team Sleep – 2:55
 "Sleeping Awake" by P.O.D. – 3:23
 "Bruises" by Ünloco – 2:36
 "Calm Like a Bomb" by Rage Against the Machine – 4:58
 "Dread Rock" by Oakenfold – 4:39
 "Zion" by Fluke – 4:33
 "When the World Ends (Oakenfold Remix)" by Dave Matthews Band – 5:26

Disc 2
 "Main Title" by Don Davis – 1:30
 "Trinity Dream" by Don Davis – 1:56
 "Teahouse" by Juno Reactor featuring Gocoo – 1:04
 "Chateau" by Rob Dougan – 3:23
 "Mona Lisa Overdrive" by Juno Reactor/Don Davis – 10:08
 "Burly Brawl" by Juno Reactor vs. Don Davis – 5:52
 "Matrix Reloaded Suite" by Don Davis – 17:34

Omitted cues

Don Davis wrote three cues which were ultimately unused in the final film. The first is an alternate of the "Burly Brawl theme," which lasts for 1:31. The second, "Multiple Replication," was used, but it was combined with a choir as well as composition by Juno Reactor. The third, "Chateau Swashbuckling," was almost completely omitted in favor of Rob Dougan's track, although the final few seconds were retained in the film. The following cue, "Double Trouble," which accompanies the scene in which the Twins chase the Keymaker, Morpheus and Trinity through the Merovingian's chateau, was altered to feature the beat track from Oakenfold's "Dread Rock."

The track "Mona Lisa Overdrive" was used in 2004 by rhythmic gymnast Anna Bessonova of Ukraine for her club routine, as well in 2008 by Eleni Andriola in her hoop routine.

Charts

Weekly charts

Year-end charts

Certifications

References

The Matrix (franchise) albums
2003 soundtrack albums
2000s film soundtrack albums
Maverick Records soundtracks
Industrial metal albums
Alternative metal albums
Alternative rock soundtracks
Nu metal albums
Electronica soundtracks
Film scores
Warner Records soundtracks
Don Davis (composer) soundtracks